The University of Calabria is a state-run university in Italy. Located in Arcavacata, a hamlet of Rende and a suburb of Cosenza, the university was founded in 1972. Among its founders there were Beniamino Andreatta, Giorgio Gagliani, Pietro Bucci and Paolo Sylos Labini.
It currently has about 35,000 students, 800 teaching and research staff and about 700 administrative staff.

Campus
The Campus of the University of Calabria was originally designed by Vittorio Gregotti and Dänen Martensson. 
The buildings are situated along a suspension bridge, which is currently 1.3 kilometres long. As in British and North-American campuses, students live in specific residential blocks near the University. 
The whole structure is swathed in greenery of hills near Arcavacata, a small village at 10 km from Cosenza, and 4 km from the city center of Rende.

Organization
The University is organized in the following departments:
Biology, ecology and geosciences
Chemistry and chemical technologies
Culture, education and society
Pharmacy and Health and Nutrition
Physics
Civil Engineering
Computer, modeling, electronics and systems engineering
Mechanical, Energy and Management Engineering
Environment engineering
Mathematics and Computer Science
Business and Law
Economics, Statistics and Finance
Political and Social Sciences
Humanities

Research

Reparto corse 

The Unical reparto corse is a project of The Department of Mechanical Engineering, Management and Energy (DIMEG) that started in 2005. The group involves students and professors applying the knowledge gained in their studies to develop race cars that compete in European races.

Points of interest 
 Botanical Garden
 Museum of Paleontology
 Arts, Music and Entertainment Center
 Sports Center

List of Honoris Causa Degrees awarded by the University of Calabria 
1981 Gerhard Rohlfs in Literature
1986 Luigi Luca Cavalli Sforza in Natural Science
1991 Silvio Berlusconi in Management Engineering
1994 Carlo Dionisotti in Literature
1996 Gianni Amelio in Literature
2000 Eric P. Hamp in Literature
2003 Frank Iacobucci in Political Science
2003 Gianvito Resta in Literature
2008 Boris Ulianich in History
2010 Saverio Strati in Modern Philology
2012 Roberto Benigni in Modern Philology
2012 Salomon Resnik in Philosophy
2012 Mario Martone in Arts, Cinema and Media languages
2013 Vandana Shiva in Nutrition Science

See also 
 List of Italian universities

References

External links

Official Web Site

 
Rende
Educational institutions established in 1972
Buildings and structures in the Province of Cosenza
Education in Calabria
1972 establishments in Italy